Eyes of the Soul is a lost 1919 American silent romantic drama film produced by Famous Players-Lasky and distributed through Paramount Pictures and Artcraft. The star of the picture is Elsie Ferguson and its director was Emile Chautard.

Plot
As described in a film publication, Gloria Swann (Ferguson) is driving Judge Malvin's (Backus) automobile when she nearly runs down Larry Gibson (Standing), a blind soldier in a wheelchair. The two meet often thereafter, with Gloria reading to him and taking him on wheelchair outings. Gloria falls in love with him. Judge Malvin, who loves Gloria, tries to dissuade her, calling the soldier a "blind wreck." When Larry's finances get low, Gloria takes some songs he has written to a music publisher, and, being a cabaret singer, performs them at the Palm Garden club. The songs are a hit, and Larry signs a contract with the publisher. Instead of a mansion with the judge, Gloria ends up living in a boarding house with Larry, but they are happy. Larry is reconciled to the loss of his sight, for he sees through "the eyes of his soul."

Cast
Elsie Ferguson as Gloria Swann
D.J. Flanagan as Teddy Safford
Wyndham Standing as Larry Gibson
George Backus as Judge Malvin
G. Durpee as Monsier Moonlight
Cora Williams as Landlady
Charles W. Charles as Valet

References

External links

Still taken on set during production

1919 films
American silent feature films
Lost American films
Famous Players-Lasky films
Films directed by Emile Chautard
Films based on American novels
1919 romantic drama films
American black-and-white films
American romantic drama films
1910s American films
Silent romantic drama films
Silent American drama films